The A219, is a road in West London, England, which connects the A404 Harrow Road in Harlesden to the A24 in South Wimbledon. Running from North to South, it starts near Willesden Junction station, crosses the Grand Union Canal and runs through Shepherd's Bush, Hammersmith and Fulham, crossing the River Thames at Putney Bridge. It continues through Putney and passes Wimbledon Common, and goes through Wimbledon to terminate just after South Wimbledon Underground station at the A24.

Landmarks on the route
Grand Union Canal (Paddington Branch)
Wormwood Scrubs
BBC Television Centre
Shepherd's Bush Green
Hammersmith Palais
Hammersmith Broadway Shopping Centre
Hammersmith Flyover
Charing Cross Hospital, Hammersmith
Fulham Palace
Putney Bridge
Putney Exchange Shopping Centre
South Thames College
Putney Heath and Wimbledon Common
Centre Court Shopping Centre

Major roads intersected by the route

A40 at White City
A4 Great West Road at Hammersmith Flyover
A205 South Circular Road at Putney
A3 at Tibbets Corner

External links

SABRE Roads by Ten – A219

Roads in England
Roads in London
Streets in the London Borough of Hammersmith and Fulham
Streets in the London Borough of Wandsworth
Transport in the London Borough of Merton